The Dhirubhai Thakar Savyasachi Saraswat Award is an honour in Gujarat, India, given annually to the person who has contributed significantly in the field of Arts. The award, created in honour of Gujarati writer and scholar Dhirubhai Thaker, is conferred by Gujarat Vishwakosh Trust since 2013. The award comprises a cash prize of  1,00,000 (one lakh), shawl, an idol of Saraswati and a citation.

Recipients 
Following is the list of recipients.

References

External links
 

Awards established in 2013
2013 establishments in Gujarat
Gujarati literary awards